Shannon Donato (born 3 April 1975) is an Australian former professional rugby league footballer who played for the South Sydney Rabbitohs, Cronulla-Sutherland Sharks and the Penrith Panthers. He also played for Italy.

Background
Shannon Donato was born in Sydney, New South Wales, Australia

South Sydney
Donato was a Rabbitohs junior and made his first grade debut in Round One, 1995. He went on to play in 19 games for the Rabbitohs over the next three seasons.

Cronulla-Sutherland
In 1998 Donato moved to the Sharks, seeking to become established as a starting hooker. However he only made one appearance for the club in 1998, starting in Round 21, after joining the Club mid season. His 1999 season was more successful as he played in 14 games.

At the end of the 1999 season Donato represented Italy in the first Mediterranean Cup.

Over the next two seasons Donato played in 19 more games.

Penrith
Donato moved to the Panthers in 2002, one of several players who followed coach John Lang from Cronulla. He played in 25 games for the club over four seasons, his career's later years being marred by injury. In particular his 2003 season was only 80 minutes long after breaking his hand ten minutes into a semi-final appearance. This injury ruined his 2004 season and he did not play a game.

He retired at the end of the 2005 season.

Life after League
After retiring Donato moved into the back office for the Panthers. He worked as the Panthers Marketing & Chief Commercial Officer.

Donato returned to his first club, the South Sydney Rabbitohs as Chief Commercial Officer and in February 2016 he became the Acting Chief Executive Officer.

References

External links
Shannon Donato bio at Yesterday's Hero
Shannon Donato bio at Sharks Forever
Shannon Donato bio at rugbyleague.co.nz

1975 births
Living people
Australian rugby league players
Australian people of Italian descent
South Sydney Rabbitohs players
Cronulla-Sutherland Sharks players
Penrith Panthers players
Italy national rugby league team captains
Italy national rugby league team players
Italian rugby league players
Italian people of Australian descent
Rugby league hookers
Rugby league players from Sydney